Enrique Ricardo Maggiolo Díaz (born 16 September 1974) is a Venezuelan football manager.

Career
Born in Caracas, Maggiolo started his career at Colegio La Salle La Colina before joining C.S. Colegio San Agustín El Paraíso in 1998. In March 2005, he was in charge of Segunda División side Estrella Roja, before leaving in December 2007.

In 2014, Maggiolo joined Atlético Venezuela as their under-18 manager. On 17 January 2017, he was named at the helm of the club's reserve team also in the second division.

In 2019, Maggiolo was appointed Deportivo Petare manager, and renewed his contract for a further campaign on 12 December of that year. On 14 February 2021, he was presented as manager of Primera División side Carabobo.

Maggiolo left Carabobo in December 2021, after his contract expired, and was named at the helm of Universidad Central also in the top tier on 6 May 2022. He resigned from the latter on 16 August, and returned to Carabobo on 7 October.

References

External links

1974 births
Living people
Sportspeople from Caracas
Venezuelan football managers
Venezuelan Primera División managers
Venezuelan Segunda División managers
Atlético Venezuela C.F. managers
Deportivo Miranda F.C. managers
Carabobo F.C. managers
Universidad Central de Venezuela F.C. managers